Ritwik Bhattacharya (born 14 October 1979 in Pathankot) is a squash player from India.

The flag bearer of Indian Squash on Professional Squash Association tour rock was the first of the accomplished junior players who brought great momentum in the Indian squash scene.

Trained in England for five years under Coach Neil Harvey, Ritwik was once India's highest ranked squash player (until superseded by Saurav Ghosal in 2013) and also its most successful with nine PSA tour titles till date. His highest world ranking was #38 in November 2008. He was the first Indian to break into the top 50 of the PSA World Rankings (May 2006).

 He has won the Indian National Squash Championship five times (1998, 2000, 2001, 2003, 2005).
 He was the finalist at the World Doubles 2004 (Team India, partner: Saurav Ghosal).
 Has earned more than 70 caps playing for India and captained the Indian Team to a top 8 finish in the World Team Championships in 2007.

Ritwik who is now out of competitive squash  has set up a squash academy START ( Squash Temple and Real Training) which currently trains over 150  tribal children  who have never been exposed to sports and hail from  economically and educationally poor background from villages in and around Mokashi on the outskirts of Mumbai in India. Trainees at Bhattacharya's academy are now a regular fixture on the Junior National Circuit.

Personal life
Ritwik Bhattacharya was in relationship with Bollywood actress Neha Dhupia but they split in June 2010. According to reports, Ritwik is now married to Pia Trivedi.

Television appearances

References

External links 
 Articles on Ritwik Bhattacharya on Cyrus' Blog
 Ritwik Bhattacharya
 

1979 births
Living people
Indian male squash players
Rashtriya Indian Military College alumni
Squash players at the 2002 Asian Games
Squash players at the 2006 Asian Games
Asian Games competitors for India
Competitors at the 2009 World Games
Fear Factor: Khatron Ke Khiladi participants